The Senate is the upper chamber of Nigeria's bicameral legislature, the National Assembly. The National Assembly (popularly referred to as NASS) is the nation's highest legislature and has the power to make laws, as summarized in chapter one, section four of the 1999 Constitution of Nigeria. The Senate consists of 109 senators. The 36 states of Nigeria are each divided in 3 senatorial districts, with each district electing one senator using the first-past-the-post electoral system. The Federal Capital Territory elects only one senator, also using first-past-the-post.

The President of the Senate is the presiding officer of the Senate, whose chief function is to guide and regulate the proceedings in the Senate. The Senate President is third in the Nigerian presidential line of succession. He is assisted by the Deputy President of the Senate. The current Senate President is Sen. Ahmed Ibrahim Lawan and the current Deputy Senate President is Ovie Omo-Agege, both members of the APC. The Senate President and his Deputy are also assisted by principal officers including the Majority Leader, Deputy Majority Leader, Minority Leader, Deputy Minority Leader, Chief Whip, Deputy Chief Whip, Minority Whip, and Deputy Minority Whip. In addition, there are 63 Standing Committees in the Senate chaired by Committee Chairmen.

The lower chamber is the House of Representatives.

State Delegations

Abia
Adamawa
Akwa Ibom
Anambra
Bauchi
Bayelsa
Benue
Borno
Cross River
Delta
Ebonyi
Edo
Ekiti
Enugu
Gombe
Imo
Jigawa
Kaduna
Kano
Katsina
Kebbi
Kogi
Kwara
Lagos
Nasarawa
Niger
Ogun
Ondo
Osun
Oyo
Plateau
Rivers
Sokoto
Taraba
Yobe
Zamfara
FCT

Functions of the Senate

Legislation
Bills may be introduced in either chamber of the National Assembly.

Checks and Balances
The constitution provides several unique functions for the Senate that form its ability to "check and balance" other elements of the Federal Government of Nigeria. These include the requirement that the Senate may advise and must consent to some of the President's government appointments; also the Senate must consent to all treaties with foreign governments and it tries all impeachments.

Majority and minority parties
The "Majority party" is the party that either has a majority of seats or can form a coalition or caucus with a majority of seats; if two or more parties are tied the Senate President's affiliation determines which party becomes the majority party. The second largest party is the Minority party.

Term
Senators are to serve a term of four years until a General election. Senators have unlimited tenure and can remain in the chamber for as long as they are re-elected in general elections.

References

External links

Map of Nigeria States' Senatorial Districts (Each Nigerian state has 3 senatorial districts.)

Nigeria
National Assembly (Nigeria)